"All Hell's Breakin' Loose" is a song by American rock band Kiss, that appeared on their 1983 album Lick It Up. It was the second and final single released from the album and did not chart in the US.

"All Hell's Breakin' Loose" is one of four songs in the history of the band in which all four (current at the time) members share songwriting credit, the others being "Love Theme from Kiss" (from the self-titled album), "Finale" (from Music from "The Elder"), and "Back to the Stone Age" (from Monster).

A video for the single was directed by Martin Kahan and produced by Lenney Grodin that featured the band wandering around a burnt-out cityscape amongst thugs, bikers, scantily-clad women, circus performers, and other odd characters. The video received some air play on MTV, and was nominated for a MTV video music award in 1984.

The song also appears on The Box Set, released by Kiss in 2001.

During their tenure in Continental Championship Wrestling, the Stud Stable used the song as their entrance theme.

Composition

Although the song is credited to all four members of the band, which then consisted of Eric Carr, Paul Stanley, Gene Simmons, and Vinnie Vincent, Carr was the primary writer of the song, coming up with the music and arrangement.

Carr originally wanted the song to reflect his Led Zeppelin influence, and was initially upset that Stanley used a rap for the verse (an early example of a rap-rock fusion). Carr later stated that he felt that Stanley's contributions to the song helped it to be included on the album and in becoming a single.

Personnel
Paul Stanley – lead vocals, rhythm guitar
Gene Simmons – bass guitar, backing vocals
Eric Carr – drums, backing vocals
Vinnie Vincent – lead guitar, backing vocals

References

Kiss (band) songs
1984 singles
1983 songs
Songs written by Eric Carr
Songs written by Gene Simmons
Songs written by Paul Stanley
Songs written by Vinnie Vincent
Mercury Records singles
Rap rock songs